The close and mid-height front vowels of English (vowels of i and e type) have undergone a variety of changes over time and often vary by dialect.

Developments involving long vowels

Until Great Vowel Shift
Middle English had a long close front vowel , and two long mid front vowels: the close-mid  and the open-mid . The three vowels generally correspond to the modern spellings ,  and  respectively, but other spellings are also possible. The spellings that became established in Early Modern English are mostly still used today, but the qualities of the sounds have changed significantly.

For other possible histories, see English historical vowel correspondences. In particular, the long vowels sometimes arose from short vowels by Middle English open syllable lengthening or other processes. For example, team comes from an originally-long Old English vowel, and eat comes from an originally-short vowel that underwent lengthening. The distinction between both groups of words is still preserved in a few dialects, as is noted in the following section.

Middle English  was shortened in certain words. Both long and short forms of such words often existed alongside each other during Middle English. In Modern English the short form has generally become standard, but the spelling  reflects the formerly-longer pronunciation. The words that were affected include several ending in d, such as bread, head, spread, and various others including breath, weather, and threat.

Meet–meat merger 
The meet–meat merger or the fleece merger is the merger of the Early Modern English vowel  (as in meat) into the vowel  (as in meet). The merger was complete in standard accents of English by about 1700.

As noted in the previous section, the Early Modern/New English (ENE) vowel  developed from Middle English  via the Great Vowel Shift, and ENE  was usually the result of Middle English  (the effect in both cases was a raising of the vowel). The merger did not affect the words in which  had undergone shortening (see section above), and a handful of other words (such as break, steak, great) also escaped the merger in the standard accents and so acquired the same vowel as brake, stake, grate. Hence, the words meat, threat (which was shortened), and great now have three different vowels although all three words once rhymed.

The merger results in the  lexical set, as defined by John Wells. Most of those that had ENE  (Middle English ) are spelled  (meat, team, eat, etc.), but some borrowed words have a single  (legal, decent, complete), or otherwise (receive, seize, phoenix, quay).

There are still some dialects in the British Isles that do not have the merger. In some (particularly rural) varieties of Irish English, the first group has , and the second preserves . A similar contrast has been reported in parts of Southern and Western England, but it is now rarely encountered there.

In some Yorkshire dialects, an additional distinction may be preserved within the meat set. Words that originally had long vowels, such as team and cream (which come from Old English tēam and Old French creme), may have , and those that had an original short vowel, which underwent open syllable lengthening in Middle English (see previous section), like eat and meat (from Old English etan and mete), have a sound resembling , similar to the sound that is heard in some dialects in words like eight and weight that lost a velar fricative).

In Alexander's book (2001) about the traditional Sheffield dialect, the spelling "eigh" is used for the vowel of eat and meat, but "eea" is used for the vowel of team and cream.  However, a 1999 survey in Sheffield found the  pronunciation to be almost extinct there.

Changes before  and  
In General American, words like near and beer now have the sequence , and nearer rhymes with mirror (the mirror–nearer merger). Several pronunciations are found in other accents, but outside North America, the nearer–mirror opposition is always preserved. For example, some conservative accents in Northern England have the sequence  in words like near, with the schwa disappearing before a pronounced , as in serious.

That is not restricted to any variety of English. It happens in both British English and (less noticeably or often) American English as well as other varieties although it is far more common for Britons. The words that have  may vary depending on dialect. Dialects that have the smoothing usually also have the diphthong  in words like beer, deer, and fear, and the smoothing causes idea, Korea, etc. to rhyme with those words.

Other changes
In Geordie, the  vowel undergoes an allophonic split, with the monophthong  being used in morphologically-closed syllables (as in freeze ) and the diphthong  being used in morphologically-open syllables not only word-finally (as in free ) but also word-internally at the end of a morpheme (as in frees ).

Most dialects of English turn  into a diphthong, and the monophthongal  is in free variation with the diphthongal  (with the former diphthong being the same as Geordie , the only difference lying in the transcription), particularly word-internally. However, word-finally, diphthongs are more common.

Compare the identical development of the close back  vowel.

Developments involving short vowels

Lowering
Middle English short /i/ has developed into a lax, near-close near-front unrounded vowel, in Modern English, as found in words like kit. (Similarly, short  has become .) According to Roger Lass, the laxing occurred in the 17th century, but other linguists have suggested that it took place potentially much earlier.

Again, however, it is not clear whether the vowel already had a lower value in Middle English.

Pin–pen merger

Examples of homophones resulting from the merger include pin–pen, kin–ken and him–hem. The merger is widespread in Southern American English and is also found in many speakers in the Midland region immediately north of the South and in areas settled by migrants from Oklahoma and Texas who settled in the Western United States during the Dust Bowl. It is also a characteristic of African-American Vernacular English.

The pin–pen merger is one of the most widely recognized features of Southern speech. A study of the written responses of American Civil War veterans from Tennessee, together with data from the Linguistic Atlas of the Gulf States and the Linguistic Atlas of the Middle South Atlantic States, shows that the prevalence of the merger was very low up to 1860 but then rose steeply to 90% in the mid-20th century. There is now very little variation throughout the South in general except that Savannah, Austin, Miami, and New Orleans are excluded from the merger. The area of consistent merger includes southern Virginia and most of the South Midland and extends westward to include much of Texas. The northern limit of the merged area shows a number of irregular curves. Central and southern Indiana is dominated by the merger, but there is very little evidence of it in Ohio, and northern Kentucky shows a solid area of distinction around Louisville.

Outside the South, most speakers of North American English maintain a clear distinction in perception and production. However, in the West, there is sporadic representation of merged speakers in Washington, Idaho, Kansas, Nebraska, and Colorado. However, the most striking concentration of merged speakers in the west is around Bakersfield, California, a pattern that may reflect the trajectory of migrant workers from the Ozarks westward.

Apparently, it came to be restricted to those positions in the late 19th and the early 20th centuries. The pin–pen merger is now commonly found only in Southern and South-West Irish English.

The merger is common in Irish-settled parts of Newfoundland and is thought to be a relic of the former Irish pronunciation.

Kit–bit split 
The kit–bit split is a split of standard English  (the  vowel) that occurs in South African English. The two distinct sounds are:
A standard , or [i] in broader accents, which is used before or after a velar consonant (lick, bi, sin; kiss, kit, ift), after  (hit), word-initially (inn), generally before  (fish), and by some speakers before  (ditch, bridge). It is found only in stressed syllables (in the first syllable of chicken, but not the second).
Different phonemic analyses of these vowels are possible. There is also the issue of the weak vowel merger in most non-conservative speakers, which means that rabbit  (conservative ) rhymes with abbott . This weak vowel is consistently written  in South African English dialectology, regardless of its precise quality.

Thank–think merger
For speakers with the lowering, think and thank, sing and sang etc. can sound alike. It is reflected in the colloquial variant spelling thang of thing.

Developments involving weak vowels

Weak vowel merger
In speakers with this merger, the words abbot and rabbit rhyme, and Lennon and Lenin are pronounced identically, as are addition and edition. However, it is possible among these merged speakers (such as General American speakers) that a distinction is still maintained in certain contexts, such as in the pronunciation of Rosa's versus roses, due to the morpheme break in Rosa's. (Speakers without the merger generally have  in the final syllables of rabbit, Lenin, roses and the first syllable of edition, distinct from the schwa  heard in the corresponding syllables of abbot, Lennon, Rosa's and addition.) If an accent with the merger is also non-rhotic, then for example chatted and chattered will be homophones. The merger also affects the weak forms of some words, causing unstressed it, for instance, to be pronounced with a schwa, so that dig it would rhyme with bigot.

The merger is very common in the Southern Hemisphere accents. Most speakers of Australian English (as well as recent Southern England English) replace weak  with schwa, although in -ing the pronunciation is frequently ; and where there is a following , as in paddck or nomadc, some speakers maintain the contrast, while some who have the merger use  as the merged vowel. In South African English most speakers have the merger, but in more conservative accents the contrast may be retained (as  vs. . Plus a kit split exists; see above).

The merger is also commonly found in American and Canadian English; however, the realization of the merged vowel varies according to syllable type, with  appearing in word-final or open-syllable word-initial positions (such as dram or clantro), but often  in other positions (abbt and xhaust). The lack of the merger is also a traditional feature of New England English. In Caribbean English schwa is often not used at all, with unreduced vowels being preferred, but if there is a schwa, then  remains distinct from it.

Furthermore,  never participates in syllabic consonant formation, so that G-dropping in words such as fishing never yields a syllabic nasal * nor a sounded mid schwa *, with the most casual RP forms being . Both  and especially  were considered to be strongly non-standard in England as late as 1982.

The merger is not complete in Scottish English, where speakers typically distinguish except from accept, but the latter can be phonemicized with an unstressed :  (as can the word-final schwa in comma ) and the former with : . Here,  is used for the sake of consistency and accuracy) and when before , as in fir  and letter  (but not fern  and fur  - see nurse mergers). The  vowel is : .

In accents without the merger, use of  rather than  prevents syllabic consonant formation.

Particularly in American linguistic tradition, the unmerged weak -type vowel is often transcribed with the barred i , the IPA symbol for the close central unrounded vowel.

Centralised 

As a result, the vowels in kit , lid , and miss  belong to the same phoneme as the unstressed vowel in balance .

It typically co-occurs with the weak vowel merger, but in Scotland the weak vowel merger is not complete; see above.

There are no homophonous pairs apart from those caused by the weak vowel merger, but a central  tends to sound like  to speakers of other dialects, which is why Australians accuse New Zealanders of saying "fush and chups" instead of "fish and chips" (which, in an Australian accent, sounds close to "feesh and cheeps"). This is not accurate, as the  vowel is always more open than the central ; in other words, there is no strut–comma merger (though a kit–strut merger is possible in some Glaswegian speech in Scotland).

In Scotland, the  vowel is commonly a close-mid , identified phonemically as : .

It can be misleading in the case of other accents.

Happy tensing  
Happy tensing is a process whereby a final unstressed i-type vowel becomes tense  rather than lax . That affects the final vowels of words such as happy, city, hurry, taxi, movie, Charlie, coffee, money, Chelsea. It may also apply in inflected forms of such words containing an additional final consonant sound, such as cities, Charlie's and hurried. It can also affect words such as me, he and she when used as clitics, as in show me, would he?
 
Until the 17th century, words like happy could end with the vowel of my (originally  but diphthongized in the Great Vowel Shift), alternating with a short i sound. (Many words spelt -ee, -ea, -ey formerly had the vowel of day; there is still alternation between that vowel and the happy vowel in words such as Sunday, Monday.) It is not entirely clear when the vowel underwent the transition. The fact that tensing is uniformly present in South African English, Australian English, and New Zealand English lends support to the idea that it may have been present in southern British English already at the beginning of the 19th century. Yet it is not mentioned by descriptive phoneticians until the early 20th century, and even then at first only in American English.
 
Conservative RP has the laxer  pronunciation. This is also found in Southern American English, in much of the north of England, and in Jamaica. In Scottish English an  sound, similar to the Scottish realization of the vowel of day, may be used. The tense [i] variant, however, is now established in General American, and is also the usual form in Canada, Australia, New Zealand and South Africa, in the south of England and in some northern cities (e.g. Liverpool, Newcastle). It is also becoming more common in modern RP.

The lax and tense variants of the happy vowel may be identified with the phonemes  and  respectively.

Most modern British dictionaries represent the happy vowel with the symbol  (distinct from both  and ). In 2012, Wells wrote that the notation "seemed like a good idea at the time, but it clearly confuses a lot of people."  criticizes the notation for causing "widespread belief in a specific 'happY vowel that "never existed".

Modern spelling with  vs.  is not an indicator of the Old English distinction between the four sounds, as spelling has been revised since after the merger occurred. After the merger occurred, the name of the letter  acquired an initial [w] sound in it, to keep it distinct from the name of the letter .

Additional mergers in Asian and African English

As a result, pairs like mitt and meet, bit and beat, and bid and bead are homophones.

For some speakers, it occurs only in front of voiceless consonants, and pairs like met, mat, bet, bat are homophones, but bed, bad or med, mad are kept distinct. For others, it occurs in all positions.

See also
Phonological history of the English language
Phonological history of English vowels

References

Bibliography
 
 
 

 
 
 

English phonology
History of the English language
Splits and mergers in English phonology